Dorcadion amorii is a species of beetle in the family Cerambycidae. It was described by Marseuil in 1856. It is known from Spain.

Subspecies
 Dorcadion amorii amorii Marseuil, 1856
 Dorcadion amorii segurense Escalera, 1911

See also 
Dorcadion

References

amorii
Beetles described in 1856